Pseudorhaphitoma pyramidula is a small sea snail, a marine gastropod mollusk in the family Mangeliidae.

Description

Distribution
This marine species is endemic to Australia and occurs off the New South Wales

References

 Laseron, C. 1954. Revision of the New South Wales Turridae (Mollusca). Australian Zoological Handbook. Sydney : Royal Zoological Society of New South Wales pp. 56, pls 1–12.

External links
 

pyramidula
Gastropods described in 1954
Gastropods of Australia